Tuholj (Cyrillic: Тухољ) is a village in Bosnia and Herzegovina. It is located in the municipality of Kladanj in Tuzla Canton, Federation of Bosnia and Herzegovina. In 1991, the majority of the 524 inhabitants were ethnic Bosniaks.

Demographics 
According to the 2013 census, its population was 337.

See also

Linked articles
 List of cities in Bosnia and Herzegovina
 Municipalities of Bosnia and Herzegovina

References

External links
 Satellite view of Tuholj

Populated places in Kladanj